Reading Writing is a 1980 book by the French writer Julien Gracq. It consists of notes and fragments on the relation between reading and writing. An English translation by Jeanine Herman was published in 2006.

Reception
Thomas McGonigle reviewed the book in Los Angeles Times in 2006 and wrote about Gracq: "He is singular in his literary accomplishments. His novels The Opposing Shore, A Dark Stranger and Balcony in the Forest remain as fresh, invigorating and moving as the day they were published." McGonigle continued about Reading Writing: "The scope of his interests and the intensity of his insight into the actual practice of writing are wonderful companions as one reads. Not only does Gracq refuse to consider writing and reading isolated from each other, but he also does not isolate them from arts such as music, painting, sculpture and film. ... The writer, student, teacher and reader are ever present in Gracq."

References

External links
 Reading Writing at the French publisher's website 
 Reading Writing at the American publisher's website

1980 books
Books about writing
French non-fiction books
French-language books
Works by Julien Gracq